The Somalia Super Cup is the football super cup competition in Somalia, played between the winners of the Somali First Division and the Somalia Cup.

Results

References

Football competitions in Somalia
Somalia